Sami Matoug (born 12 November 1999) is a French professional footballer who plays as a midfielder for Paris FC.

Career
On 11 July 2019, Matoug signed his first professional contract with Paris FC. He made his professional debut with Paris FC in a 1–1 Ligue 2 tie with Sochaux on 10 January 2020.

References

External links
 
 

1999 births
Living people
Sportspeople from Versailles, Yvelines
French footballers
French sportspeople of Algerian descent
Association football midfielders
Paris FC players
Ligue 2 players
Championnat National players
Championnat National 3 players
Footballers from Yvelines